Hamurana is a settlement and area of natural springs on the northern side of Lake Rotorua, in Rotorua Lakes within the Bay of Plenty Region of New Zealand's North Island. It includes the deepest natural spring on the North Island, emerging from a rocky area within the Hamurana Springs Recreation Reserve.

Demographics

Hamurana had a population of 1,032 at the 2018 New Zealand census, an increase of 27 people (2.7%) since the 2013 census, and an increase of 69 people (7.2%) since the 2006 census. There were 402 households, comprising 522 males and 510 females, giving a sex ratio of 1.02 males per female. The median age was 49.4 years (compared with 37.4 years nationally), with 165 people (16.0%) aged under 15 years, 114 (11.0%) aged 15 to 29, 567 (54.9%) aged 30 to 64, and 189 (18.3%) aged 65 or older.

Ethnicities were 91.0% European/Pākehā, 16.9% Māori, 1.2% Pacific peoples, 2.6% Asian, and 2.0% other ethnicities. People may identify with more than one ethnicity.

The percentage of people born overseas was 19.8, compared with 27.1% nationally.

Although some people chose not to answer the census's question about religious affiliation, 54.7% had no religion, 32.8% were Christian, 0.6% had Māori religious beliefs and 2.0% had other religions.

Of those at least 15 years old, 201 (23.2%) people had a bachelor's or higher degree, and 147 (17.0%) people had no formal qualifications. The median income was $39,000, compared with $31,800 nationally. 207 people (23.9%) earned over $70,000 compared to 17.2% nationally. The employment status of those at least 15 was that 480 (55.4%) people were employed full-time, 141 (16.3%) were part-time, and 18 (2.1%) were unemployed.

Hamurana Springs

The Hamurana Springs are a collection of springs on the site, officially named Hamurana Springs Recreation Reserve since 1971.

Hangarua Spring

The main spring is 920 feet (280 m) above sea level and is approximately 15 metres (50 ft) deep. It produces an estimated 4 million litres of crystal clear water per hour at a fairly constant temperature of 10 degrees Celsius. The rock surrounding this spring is volcanic (rhyolitic). The spring water travels down from the Mamaku Plateau through underground aquifers, taking 70 years to get here.

Dancing Sands Spring
Another identified spring in the reserve is the Dancing Sands spring, named because of the effect of the emerging water on the sand on the bottom of the spring.

Hamurana Stream
The spring flows as a stream for approximately one kilometre in the Hamurana Springs Recreation Reserve through a patch of redwoods forest before joining Lake Rotorua. In summer the stream is home to rainbow trout who prefer the cooler temperature of the spring water.

Ownership
Ownership of the springs and other nearby sites of cultural significance was returned to the Ngati Rangiwewehi iwi under the  Ngati Rangiwewehi Claims Settlement Bill 2014. The Act also declares the Hamurana Springs A and Hamurana Springs B as reserves subject to sections 17 and 18 respectively of the Reserves Act 1977.

Access for the public to the springs and reserve maintained by the Department of Conservation was historically free, however, access is now fully enclosed and only paid access is available .

References

Rotorua Lakes District
Populated places in the Bay of Plenty Region
Landforms of the Bay of Plenty Region
Springs of New Zealand
Populated places on Lake Rotorua